Ceratophyllus hagoromo is a species of flea in the family Ceratophyllidae. It was described by Jameson and Sakaguti in 1959.

References 

Ceratophyllidae
Insects described in 1959